Matijas is both a given name and a surname. Notable people with the name include:

 Jonathan Matijas (born 1990), French-Algerian footballer
 Matijas Pejić (born 1988), Bosnian footballer

See also
 Matias
 Matija, given name
 Matthew (name)